Alexandria is a village in Licking County, Ohio, United States. The population was 517 at the 2010 census and an estimated 542 in 2019.

Alexandria was laid out in 1830. Village voters defeated a ballot issue to dissolve the village and become a part of St. Albans Township. The vote was 92% against the dissolution on May 8, 2018.

History
The village has a rich history including citizens who played a crucial role in the Underground Railroad, sheltering many escaped slaves on their way to freedom.

Notable people
Bill Comstock, singer, member of The Four Freshmen

Geography

Demographics

2010 census
At the 2010 census, there were 517 people, 182 households and 144 families living in the village. The racial make-up was 98.5% White, 0.6% Native American, and 1.0% from two or more races. Hispanic or Latino of any race were 1.2% of the population.

There were 182 households, of which 50.0% had children under the age of 18 living with them, 58.8% were married couples living together, 14.8% had a female householder with no husband present, 5.5% had a male householder with no wife present, and 20.9% were non-families. 15.9% of all households were made up of individuals, and 4.4% had someone living alone who was 65 years of age or older. The average household size was 2.84 and the average family size was 3.13.

The median age was 34.9 years. 30.2% of residents were under the age of 18; 7.6% were between the ages of 18 and 24; 28.3% were from 25 to 44; 22.7% were from 45 to 64; and 11.4% were 65 years of age or older. The gender makeup of the village was 49.5% male and 50.5% female.

2000 census
At the 2000 census, there were 485 people, 29 households and 22 families living in the village. The racial make-up was 98.82% White and 1.18% Native American. Hispanic or Latino of any race were 1.18% of the population.

There were 29 households, of which 37.9% had children under the age of 18 living with them, 72.4% were married couples living together, and 24.1% were non-families. 20.7% of all households were made up of individuals, and 13.8% had someone living alone who was 65 years of age or older. The average household size was 2.93 and the average family size was 3.45.

34.1% of the population were under the age of 18, 4.7% from 18 to 24, 32.9% from 25 to 44, 15.3% from 45 to 64, and 12.9% were 65 years of age or older. The median age was 32 years. For every 100 females there were 107.3 males. For every 100 females age 18 and over, there were 100.0 males.

The median household income was $29,688 and the median family income was $41,250. Males had a median income of $26,250 and females $0. The per capita income was $16,235. None of the population and none of the families were below the poverty line.

Locations of interest 
Located in town, Alexandria Public Library serves the residents of Alexandria. Fireman's Park, Lobdell Reserve, Parker Community Park and the Fritz Drumm Field of Dreams are all located in or very near the village. The Alexandria Museum, on Main Street, is a small house museum.

Schooling 
Residents of Alexandria and the surrounding areas attend Northridge Local School District, which includes: Northridge Primary (located within Alexandria's limits), Northridge Intermediary, Northridge Middle School and Northridge High School (in Johnstown).

References

External links
 Village of Alexandria official website
 Alexandria Public Library
 Northridge Local School District
 Past and present photos of Alexandria

Villages in Licking County, Ohio
Villages in Ohio
1830 establishments in Ohio
Populated places established in 1830